The gens Corfidia was a Roman family during the first century BC.  The gens is known primarily for a single individual, Lucius Corfidius, an eques, whom Cicero erroneously mentioned in his oration Pro Ligario (46 BC), as one of the distinguished men who were interceding with Caesar on behalf of Ligarius.  After the oration was published, Cicero was reminded that Corfidius had died before the speech was delivered.  His return to life was the subject of an amusing tale related by the elder Plinius.

See also
 List of Roman gentes

References

Roman gentes